Greece competed at the 1948 Summer Olympics in London, England. Greek athletes have competed in every Summer Olympic Games. 61 competitors, 60 men and 1 woman, took part in 44 events in 10 sports.

Athletics

Cycling

Three cyclists, all men, represented Greece in 1948.

Individual road race
 Manthos Kaloudis
 Evangelos Kouvelis
 Petros Leonidis

Team road race
 Manthos Kaloudis
 Evangelos Kouvelis
 Petros Leonidis

Sprint
 Manthos Kaloudis

Fencing

Six fencers, all men, represented Greece in 1948.

Men's foil
 Ioannis Karamazakis
 Konstantinos Bembis
 Stefanos Zintzos

Men's team foil
 Athanasios Nanopoulos, Stefanos Zintzos, Ioannis Karamazakis, Konstantinos Bembis

Men's épée
 Andreas Skotidas
 Ioannis Karamazakis
 Athanasios Nanopoulos

Men's team épée
 Athanasios Nanopoulos, Andreas Skotidas, Stefanos Zintzos, Konstantinos Bembis, Ioannis Karamazakis

Men's sabre
 Nikolaos Khristogiannopoulos
 Athanasios Nanopoulos
 Ioannis Karamazakis

Men's team sabre
 Nikolaos Khristogiannopoulos, Athanasios Nanopoulos, Ioannis Karamazakis, Andreas Skotidas

Rowing

Greece had eight male rowers participate in three out of seven rowing events in 1948.

 Men's single sculls
 Faidon Matthaiou

 Men's coxed pair
 Iakovidis Diakoumakos
 Georgios Venieris
 Grigorios Emmanouil (cox)

 Men's coxed four
 Filas Paraskevaidis
 Nikos Filippidis
 Iraklis Klangas
 Nikos Nikolaou
 Grigorios Emmanouil (cox)

Sailing

Shooting

Seven shooters represented Greece in 1948.

25 metre pistol
 Konstantinos Mylonas
 Georgios Vikhos
 Vangelis Khrysafis

50 metre pistol
 Vangelis Khrysafis
 Nikolaos Tzovlas
 Georgios Stathis

50 metre rifle
 Ilias Valatas
 Georgios Vikhos
 Athanasios Aravositas

Swimming

Water polo

Wrestling

Art competitions

References

External links
Official Olympic Reports

Nations at the 1948 Summer Olympics
1948
Summer Olympics